Sutherlin High School is a public high school located in Sutherlin, Oregon, United States.

Academics
In 2008, 76% of the school's seniors received their high school diploma. Of 120 students, 91 graduated, 20 dropped out, two received a modified diploma, and seven were still in high school the following year.

Notable alumni
 Steve M. Thompson, member of the Alaska House of Representatives from Fairbanks since 2011; mayor of Fairbanks, 2001-2007

References

High schools in Douglas County, Oregon
Public high schools in Oregon